The Bangladesh National Museum, is the national museum of Bangladesh. The museum is well organized and displays have been housed chronologically in several departments like department of ethnography and decorative art, department of history and classical art, department of natural history, and department of contemporary and world civilization.  The museum also has a rich conservation laboratory. Nalini Kanta Bhattasali served as the first curator of the museum during 1914–1947.

History 

Bangladesh National Museum was originally established on 20 March 1913, albeit under another name (Dacca Museum), and formally inaugurated on 7 August 1913 by The Lord Carmichael, the governor of Bengal. In July 1915 it was handed over to the Naib Nazim of Dhaka. Bangladesh National Museum was formed through the incorporation of Dhaka museum and it was made the national museum of Bangladesh on 17 November 1983. It is located at Shahbag, Dhaka.

Ground floor 
The ground floor consists of some old guns at the entrance and the hall where the people book their tickets or assemble to hear the history of the museum. The hall leads to a grand staircase. Beside the hall, there is a smaller room which also acts like the hall (it is also used by the guides to tell the visitors about the history) and a simple staircase.

First floor 
The first floor is divided into 22 rooms.

First room 
The first room displays a large map showing the map of Bangladesh and its 64 districts.

Second room 
The second room consists of an under going work of a large statue of a royal Bengal tiger.

Third-tenth rooms 
These rooms consist of natural beauties found in Bangladesh. In one of the room there is showcase of a tongue of a whale.

Tenth-22nd rooms 
The other rooms contain some historic relics of Bengal up to 1900. There is a room which shows the different boats used by the rural people.

Second floor 
The second floor consists of photos of famous people and showcases the Bangladesh Liberation War and the Language Movement of 1952. There are posters used in the war, a torture machine and much more. There are also two libraries.

Third floor 
The third floor consists of pictures of international politicians, artists, scientists, famous pictures and four international galleries - Chinese, Korean, Iranian and Swiss.

Gallery

References

External links 

 
 

Museums established in 1913
Art museums and galleries in Bangladesh
Bangladesh
Museums in Dhaka
Natural history museums
History museums in Bangladesh
Decorative arts museums
Ethnographic museums in Asia
1913 establishments in India
Recipients of the Ekushey Padak
Government Museum